Ed Dixon (born September 2, 1948 in Oklahoma) is an American character actor, playwright and composer.

Actor

Dixon has appeared in numerous Broadway shows, including No, No, Nanette, The King of Schnorrers, The Three Musketeers, Les Misérables (the show's 2nd and longest running Thenardier), Cyrano, The Scarlet Pimpernel, The Iceman Cometh, The Best Man, How the Grinch Stole Christmas, Sunday in the Park with George, Mary Poppins and Anything Goes. In 1987 he was nominated for a Drama Desk Award for his performance in the musical Shylock, for which he wrote the book, music, and lyrics.

Dixon was a soloist in the Kennedy Center's premiere production of Leonard Bernstein's Mass and is on the recording conducted by the composer. He can also be heard on the cast recording of the 2001 national tour of The Best Little Whorehouse in Texas. Dixon toured as the Governor opposite Ann-Margret as Miss Mona and Gary Sandy as Ed Earl Dodd. He was nominated for the Helen Hayes Award for best supporting actor in a musical in Kathy Lee Gifford's Saving Aimee and won the 2010 Helen Hayes Award for best supporting actor in a musical for his turn as Max in Sunset Blvd. For his creation, Georgie: My Adventures with George Rose off-Broadway, he won the 2017 Drama Desk Award for best solo performance.

Playwright & composer

Dixon is the author/composer of Fanny Hill, which debuted in New York at The York Theatre after being launched at Goodspeed Musicals. Fanny Hill was nominated for two Drama Desk Awards and one Drama-Logue Award. Dixon also wrote the musical Richard Cory with noted playwright A. R. Gurney. The musical won the Festival Prize and the Audience Award when it debuted at the New York Musical Theatre Festival.His latest work, Whodunit... The Musical, based on a Mary Roberts Rinehart mystery has gained critical acclaim in regional venues throughout the United States.

Memoirs

Dixon released his memoir SECRETS OF A LIFE ON STAGE... AND OFF on May 3, 2012.

References

American male stage actors
1948 births
Living people